Hutton's vireo (Vireo huttoni) is a small  songbird. It is approximately 5 inches (12–13 cm) in length, dull olive-gray above and below. It has a faint white eye ring and faint white wing bars.  It closely resembles a ruby-crowned kinglet, but has a thicker bill, blue-gray legs, and is slightly larger in size.  Its most common song is a repeated chu-wee, or a chew, but will have other variations.  Its call is a mewing chatter.

It is found from southern British Columbia in Canada to central Guatemala in Central America.  Recent DNA studies suggest this species may be split into at least 2 different species, with coastal Pacific birds showing enough genetic variation when compared to interior ones.

This vireo makes a hanging cup nest suspended from a fork of a tree.  The female lays 3–4 eggs.  The eggs are mostly white in color, with scattered brown spotting.  It prefers deciduous-mixed forests, and is particularly fond of live oak. It feeds by gleaning insects as it deliberately moves through the forest canopy.

Birds are mostly resident year-round, but there may be some altitudinal and short distance migration. Hutton's vireo may join a mixed-species flock for the winter.

The scientific name commemorates the US surveyor William Rich Hutton.

References

External links

Hutton's Vireo Species Account - Cornell Lab of Ornithology
Hutton's Vireo - Vireo huttoni - USGS Patuxent Bird Identification InfoCenter
Hutton's Vireo species account-E-Nature
Hutton's Vireo photo gallery VIREO

Hutton's vireo
Native birds of Western Canada
Native birds of the West Coast of the United States
Birds of the Sierra Nevada (United States)
Birds of Mexico
Birds of the Sierra Madre Occidental
Birds of the Sierra Madre Oriental
Birds of the Sierra Madre del Sur
Birds of the Trans-Mexican Volcanic Belt
Birds of Guatemala
Hutton's vireo